"The Undertakers" is the second episode of the third series of the 1960s cult British spy-fi television series The Avengers, starring Patrick Macnee and Honor Blackman. It was first broadcast by ABC on 5 October 1963. The episode was directed by Bill Bain and written by Malcolm Hulke.

Plot
Why are they coming for people who aren't dead yet? A dodgy retirement home is being used as part of a scam to avoid inheritance tax. Steed and Cathy investigate.

Cast
 Patrick Macnee as John Steed
 Honor Blackman as Cathy Gale 
 Lee Patterson as Lomax 
 Jan Holden as Paula Madden 
 Lally Bowers as Mrs. Renter 
 Patrick Holt as Robert Madden 
 Mandy Miller as Daphne Madden 
 Howard Goorney as Green 
 Marcella Markham as Mrs. Lomax 
 Ronald Russell as Wilkinson 
 Helena McCarthy as Mrs. Baker 
 Denis Forsyth as Reeve

References

External links

Episode overview on The Avengers Forever! website

The Avengers (season 3) episodes
1963 British television episodes